The American Rainwater Catchment Systems Association (commonly referred to as ARCSA) is an American non-profit association founded by Dr. Hari Krishna in 1994, focused on rainwater awareness and to promote sustainable rainwater harvesting (RWH) practices in the United States and around the world.

ARCSA's efforts include: creating a favorable regulatory atmosphere, creating a resource pool and educating professionals and the general public regarding safe rainwater harvesting design, installation and maintenance practices. It has more than 1,500 members consisting of both manufacturers as well as dealers/distributors of equipment.

In 2014, ARCSA created a White House petition to stimulate the rainwater-harvesting industry. While the petition didn't receive the 100,000 votes in 3 months needed to move to the next stage, ARCSA used this as a platform to begin a petition with Change.org to create an International Rainwater Harvesting Day.

In 2015, ARCSA merged with the Canadian Association of Rainwater Management (CANARM) and will continue as a North American association.

References

External links
Arcsa.org

Non-profit organizations based in Arizona
Water conservation in the United States
Rainwater harvesting
Water organizations in the United States